Sananth is an Indian actor who has worked in Tamil cinema. After initially appearing in several short films, Sananth made his feature film debut in Ajay Gnanamuthu's horror film Demonte Colony (2015).

Career 
Before making his debut on big screen, Sananth featured in several short films. His short film Madhu, was directed by Rathnakumar and released in 2013. Madhu was selected to be a part of the anthology film Bench Talkies, and later made into a feature film titled Meyaadha Maan.

Sananth then played one of the lead characters in the feature horror film Demonte Colony. His second feature film in a lead role was Jil Jung Juk, a dark humour film in 2016, alongside Siddharth and Avinash Raghudevan. He next got associated himself in a web series produced and directed by Balaji Mohan, titled As I'm Suffering From Kadhal.

Sananth then made a breakthrough as a lead actor by featuring in Karthik Subbaraj's silent thriller drama Mercury (2018), where he worked alongside actors Prabhu Deva and Indhuja Ravichandran.

In 2019, he collaborated again with Karthik Subbaraj in Petta, which marked Sananth's most high-profile role to date. Featuring in an ensemble cast alongside Rajinikanth, Vijay Sethupathi and Nawazuddin Siddiqui, Sananth played the role of the college student Anwar who is guarded by Rajinikanth's titular character. The film opened to mixed-to-positive reviews from critics and became a financial success at the box office.

In 2022, he made his third collaboration with Karthik Subbaraj in Mahaan, in which he had an important role. The film features Vikram, Dhruv Vikram and some actors from the casting of Petta like Bobby Simha, Simran, Aadukalam Naren and Ramachandran Durairaj. The film was released in Amazon Prime Video to generally positive reviews.

Filmography
Films

Web-series

References

External links
 
 Sananth on Facebook: @sananthofficial

Living people
Year of birth missing (living people)
Male actors in Tamil cinema
Indian male film actors
21st-century Indian male actors